Xyletobius proteus is a species of beetle in the family Ptinidae.

Subspecies
These six subspecies belong to the species Xyletobius proteus:
 Xyletobius proteus apicalis Perkins, 1910
 Xyletobius proteus dorsalis Perkins, 1910
 Xyletobius proteus hastatus Perkins, 1910
 Xyletobius proteus maurus Perkins, 1910
 Xyletobius proteus proteus Perkins, 1910
 Xyletobius proteus simplex Perkins, 1910

References

Further reading

 
 
 
 

Ptinidae
Beetles described in 1910